Congo is a 1995 American science fiction action-adventure film based on the 1980 novel by Michael Crichton. It was directed by Frank Marshall and stars Laura Linney, Dylan Walsh, Ernie Hudson, Grant Heslov, Joe Don Baker and Tim Curry. Congo was released on June 9, 1995, by Paramount Pictures. It received negative reviews but performed better than expected at the box office.

Plot

While searching for rare blue diamonds that could lead to a new revolutionary communications laser, TraviCom employees Charles Travis and Jeffrey Weems discover the ruins of a lost city near a volcanic site in a remote part of the Congo jungle. Karen Ross, Charles's ex-fiancée and a former CIA operative, and R. B. Travis, Charles's father and the CEO of TraviCom, lose contact with the team while tracking their progress at the company headquarters. Activating a remote camera, they find the camp destroyed and strewn with corpses, as well as a savage ape-like creature that destroys the camera. Travis asks Karen to lead another expedition to the site.

Meanwhile, Peter Elliott, a primatologist at the University of California, Berkeley, and his assistant Richard teach human communication to primates using a mountain gorilla named Amy. With a specialized backpack and glove, her sign language is translated to a digitized voice. Despite the success, Peter is concerned by Amy's drawings of jungles and the Eye of Providence, and seeks funding to return her to Africa, but the university is reluctant. Romanian philanthropist Herkermer Homolka offers to fund the expedition, and Karen asks permission to join it since her visas will be invalid unless connected to such a venture. Peter is hesitant at first, seeing Amy's jealousy of Karen, but allows her to join and pay part of the expenses after Homolka is unable to provide funding.
 
The group flies to Africa and lands in Uganda, where they meet wilderness guide Monroe Kelly. They are detained and questioned by Captain Wanta, a local military leader, who warns them not to trust Homolka and lets them proceed only after Karen pays him a large bribe. As the group crosses to Tanzania to board another plane that will take them to Zaire, Monroe reveals that Homolka has led previous safaris in search of the "Lost City of Zinj", with disastrous results. The group parachutes into the jungle just before their plane is shot down by Zairean soldiers.

On the ground, they encounter a native tribe that leads them to Bob Driscoll, a wounded member of Charles's expedition. On seeing Amy approaching, Bob begins screaming in fear and soon dies. The group continues by boat, and learn that Homolka, in search of Zinj and its fabled diamond mine, believes that Amy's drawings suggest she has seen the mine and can lead them to it. After an attack by massive hippos, they find the ruined camp and the nearby City of Zinj. Richard and a couple of porters are killed by a vicious grey gorilla. The group take shelter at the ruined camp, keeping other gorillas at bay with automated sentry guns and detectors.

When day breaks, they find Homolka, several porters and Amy missing. They return to the city, where they find Homolka exploring, and surmise from hieroglyphs that the city's inhabitants specially bred the grey gorillas, encouraging their violent tendencies to guard the mine and kill anyone looking to steal the diamonds. The group suspects the gorillas turned on their masters yet still continue to protect the mine. They find the mine and are faced with a troop of grey gorillas. Homolka begins to collect diamonds, but is soon cornered and killed by some of the apes. Monroe, Karen and Peter flee deeper into the mine, where they discover Jeffrey and Charles's bodies with the latter still holding a giant blue diamond in hand. As Amy protects Peter, Monroe fends off the other gorillas until Karen can fit the diamond into a portable laser, allowing her to power it up and kill several gorillas. The volcano begins to erupt, and the four escape as the city is flooded with lava, killing the gorillas.

Once safe, Karen reports to Travis on finding the diamond and confirming Charles's death. Realizing Travis was only interested in the diamond, she uses her laser to destroy the TraviCom satellite. In the nearby wreckage of another one of Travis's expedition cargo planes they had found earlier, they find a hot-air balloon, and prepare to leave. Peter sees Amy with a troop of gorillas and bids her goodbye. The three take off in the balloon, and Peter throws the diamond back into the jungle below. Amy watches the departing balloon with a smile, then joins her new gorilla family.

Cast

 Laura Linney as Karen Ross, an electronics expert for TraviCom, and a former CIA operative, who hopes to find her ex-fiancé lost in a previous expedition to the Congo.
 Dylan Walsh as Peter Elliott, a primatologist of Berkeley, California, who wants to return his mountain gorilla, Amy, to her birthplace in the Congo's Virunga Region
 Ernie Hudson as Captain Monroe Kelly, the "Great White Hunter" who "also happens to be black"—a mercenary who leads the group into the jungle.
 Tim Curry as Herkermer Homolka, a Romanian man who offers to finance the expedition. He poses as a wealthy philanthropist, but is soon revealed to be in dire financial straits. His real aim is to find the mythical Lost City of Zinj, where he lost another expedition some years before.
 Grant Heslov as Richard, Peter's research assistant.
 Joe Don Baker as R.B. Travis, TraviCom's CEO, Charles's father and Karen's boss. He wants to find the diamond mines to finance and expand his satellite technologies.
 Bruce Campbell as Charlie Travis, Karen's ex-fiancé and R.B.'s son.
 Taylor Nichols as Jeffrey Weems, Charlie's friend who was in the previous expedition with Charlie.
 Adewale Akinnuoye-Agbaje as Kahega, Monroe's deputy and leader of the expedition's African porters.
 Joe Pantoliano as Eddie Ventro (uncredited), an American living in Central Africa who hires Monroe and organizes the group's transportation and materials.
 Delroy Lindo as Captain Wanta (uncredited), a corrupt Ugandan military officer whom the group must bribe in order to gain safe passage.
 John Hawkes as Bob Driscoll, a member of the TraviCom expedition with Charlie and Jeffrey.
 Mary Ellen Trainor as Moira
 Stuart Pankin as Boyd
 Carolyn Seymour as Eleanor Romy
 Romy Rosemont as Assistant
 James Karen as College President
 Thom Barry as Samahani, Truck driver transporting Ross, Monroe, Elliot, Homolka, Richard and Amy from the airport to a roadblock.
 Michael Chinyamurindi as Claude from Mombasa, a porter hired to help protect the expedition.
 Fidel Bateke as Mizumu Witch Doctor, he uses his powers to bring Bob Driscoll back to life.
 Kevin Grevioux as Roadblock Officer
 Darnell Suttles as Hospital Interrogator
 Robert Almodovar as Rudy, TraviCom head of security
 Peter Jason as Mr. Janus
 Kathleen Connors as Sally
 Lola Noh & Misty Rosas as Amy The Gorilla 
 Shayna Fox provides the voice of Amy
 Frank Welker provided the vocal effects for the gorillas.
 Gary A. Hecker & Peter Elliott provide the gorilla vocalization.

Production

Development and writing
After the success of The First Great Train Robbery, Crichton decided to write a screenplay specifically for Sean Connery, as the character of Charles Munro, an archetypal "great white hunter" akin to H. Rider Haggard's hero, Allan Quatermain. The film was envisioned as an homage to classic pulp adventure tales, and Crichton successfully pitched the movie to 20th Century Fox in 1979 without a fleshed out story. However, the film ran into problems when Crichton learned that he could not use a real gorilla to portray the character of Amy, which led to him leaving the project. From there, it was offered to several directors including Steven Spielberg and John Carpenter who both declined. A brief attempt was made to revive the project in the late 1980s but to no avail. Eventually, Frank Marshall directed the film with little, if any, involvement from  Crichton. The film's teaser credits John Patrick Shanley and Crichton as co-screenwriters, but the subsequent trailer and the film itself credit Shanley alone.

Originally, Delroy Lindo was set to shoot his scene in the Dominican Republic but ended up shooting it in Pasadena, California. Jimmy Buffett has a cameo as the pilot of the jet transport.

Release

Marketing
A teaser trailer for Congo debuted in theaters on November 18, 1994 with the release of Star Trek Generations. It was also attached to the VHS release of Forrest Gump. Promotional partners included Taco Bell, Coca-Cola and Kenner Products.

Home media
Congo was released on VHS and LaserDisc on November 21, 1995. The LaserDisc release is THX certified and consists of widescreen and pan and scan fullscreen versions. A widescreen VHS release debuted a year later on September 10, 1996. The film was then released on DVD on July 27, 1999.

Reception

Box office
Congo was estimated to gross $13-$15 million in its opening weekend but surprised the industry when it grossed $24.6 million for the weekend, placing number one at the US box office. In the United States and Canada, the film grossed $81,022,101. The final worldwide gross $152,022,101 worldwide versus a $50,000,000 budget.

Critical response

Rotten Tomatoes retroactively collected 51 reviews to give the film an approval rating of 22%. The site's consensus states: "Mired in campy visual effects and charmless characters, Congo is a suspenseless adventure that betrays little curiosity about the scientific concepts it purports to care about." Metacritic rated it 22/100 based on 19 reviews, meaning "generally unfavorable reviews". Roger Ebert of Chicago Sun-Times rated it 3 out of 4 stars. He called the film a splendid example of a genre no longer much in fashion, the jungle adventure story. It was also nominated for seven Golden Raspberry Awards. Hal Hinson of The Washington Post called the film a "Spielberg knockoff...shamelessly lifting themes and ideas from a handful of Steven's greatest hits." Hinson also criticized Amy the gorilla as "the most disappointing 'performance' of all" and opined that the supporting actors, Tim Curry and Ernie Hudson, stood out more than the lead actors.

The A.V. Clubs Ignatiy Vishnevetsky said Congo was full of "goofy pleasures" like "delectably goofy" lasers and "mutant killer apes", calling it one of the most "enjoyable" films that came out of the post-Jurassic Park period. He went on to say that he enjoyed the film more as a campy comedy than as the thriller the trailers made it out to be and concluded the write-up by asking "Is Congo a good film? It's certainly a good time."

Accolades

Other media

Video game
A video game based on the film, Congo the Movie: The Lost City of Zinj, was released in 1996. A different game for the Super Nintendo Entertainment System and Sega Genesis was in development, but was cancelled. Another adventure game was released for PC and Macintosh called Congo the Movie: Descent into Zinj.

Pinball
A pinball machine named Congo was produced that was based on the film.

References

External links
 
 
 
 

1995 films
1995 horror films
1990s adventure films
1990s monster movies
1990s science fiction action films
American monster movies
American natural horror films
American science fiction action films
American Sign Language films
1990s English-language films
Swahili-language films
Films about gorillas
Films about volcanoes
Films based on science fiction novels
Films scored by Jerry Goldsmith
Films based on works by Michael Crichton
Films directed by Frank Marshall
Films produced by Kathleen Kennedy
Films set in Africa
Films set in the Democratic Republic of the Congo
Films shot in Uganda
Jungle adventure films
Paramount Pictures films
Films with screenplays by John Patrick Shanley
Techno-thriller films
The Kennedy/Marshall Company films
Treasure hunt films
1990s American films